István Bibó (7 August 1911, Budapest – 10 May 1979, Budapest) was a Hungarian lawyer, civil servant, politician and political theorist.

Life 
During the Hungarian Revolution he acted as the Minister of State for the Hungarian National Government. When the Soviets invaded to crush the rebellious government, he was the last Minister left at his post in the Hungarian Parliament building in Budapest. Rather than evacuate, he stayed in the building and wrote his famous proclamation, "For Freedom and Truth", as he awaited arrest.

Bibó was arrested on 23 May 1957 and sentenced to life imprisonment on 2 August 1958 but released in the 1963 amnesty.

Bibó received a law degree from the Franz Joseph University and later taught there. He also received a PhD from the Graduate Institute of International and Development Studies, in Geneva.

His works 
 The Crisis of Hungarian Democracy

 Valóság (October 1945) 
 The Poverty of Eastern European Small States': (A kelet-európai kisállamok nyomorúsága, Új Magyarország, Bp., 1946 ); Misère des petits États d'Europe de l'Est. L'Harmattan, 1986 (out of print); Albin Michel, Paris, 1993 (current edition) 
 The Paralysis of International Institutions and the Remedies. A Study of Self-Determination, Concord among the Major Powers, and Political Arbitration (introduction by Bernard Crick). The Harvester Press, Hassocks, 1976
 Democracy, Revolution, Self-Determination: Selected Writings. Edited by Károly Nagy. Translated by András Boros-Kazai. Columbia University Press, New York, 1991
 The Art of Peacemaking: The Political Essays of István Bibó. New Haven: Yale University Press, 2015

 Memory 

 Bibo Prize founded in Boston (1980)
 5000 Forint coin issued by the National Bank of Hungary (2011)
 The Budapest Eötvös Loránd University named a special honors society/extracurricular studies program after Bibo – the Bibo Istvan Szakkollegium.  The society is open to students of law or political sciences who pass a rigorous entrance exam.  Attaining membership in the society is considered an honor of its own.

References

 External links 

 István Bibó, English

 Bibo Istvan Szakkollegium
  Reprinted from: The Paralysis of International Institutions and the Remedies. London: The Harvester Press, 1976, 
 István Bibó at Encyclopædia Britannica''

1911 births
1979 deaths
Politicians from Budapest
People from the Kingdom of Hungary
Hungarian Calvinist and Reformed Christians
National Peasant Party (Hungary) politicians
Government ministers of Hungary
People of the Hungarian Revolution of 1956
Members of the Hungarian Academy of Sciences
Franz Joseph University alumni
Graduate Institute of International and Development Studies alumni